The China Advertising Association (CAA) is a state-supported, 2,000-member trade association for China's advertising industry.

In 2021, it was reported that the CAA was sponsoring the development of CAID, a technology for circumventing Apple's anti-tracking countermeasures.

References

See also 
 China International Advertising Festival

Advertising trade associations
Organizations based in China